Mount Meek is located in the Teton Range, on the border of Caribou-Targhee National Forest and Grand Teton National Park, U.S. state of Wyoming. Mount Meek is west of Mount Meek Pass and about  ENE of Mount Jedediah Smith.

References

Meek
Meek
Meek